Maelle Di Cintio (born 20 April 1991) is a French judoka.

She is the silver medallist of the 2018 Judo Grand Slam Ekaterinburg in the -63 kg category.

References

External links
 

1991 births
Living people
French female judoka
21st-century French women